Southern Oregon University fielded its first football team in 1927. That season, playing as the Southern Oregon Normal School, was the first of only two undefeated and untied seasons in school history.

1927

1928

1929

1930

1931

† Homecoming

Southern Oregon Raiders football seasons